Pachycoris is a genus of true bugs in the family Scutelleridae, subfamily Pachycorinae. The adults often have large bright spots. It was described by Charles Jean-Baptiste Amyot and Jean Guillaume Audinet-Serville in 1843.

Behavior
Pachycoris species generally feed on Euphorbiaceae, such as Cnidoscolus, Croton, and Jatropha.

Eggs are laid in masses and nymphs are usually gregarious in the early instars. Maternal care has been observed in several species.

Species
 Pachycoris torridus
 Pachycoris klugii
 Pachycoris stallii
 Pachycoris fabricii

References

Scutelleridae
Hemiptera of Central America